Old St. Patrick's Church may refer to:
 Old St. Patrick's Church (Chicago), listed on the NRHP in Illinois
 Old St. Patrick's Church (Gravois Mills, Missouri), listed on the NRHP in Missouri
 Old St. Patrick's Church (Wellington, Ohio), listed on the NRHP in Ohio